The Mediterranean countries are those that surround the Mediterranean Sea or located within the Mediterranean Basin. Twenty sovereign countries in Southern Europe, Western Asia and North Africa regions border the sea itself, in addition to two island nations completely located in it (Malta and Cyprus).

While not having a coastline in the Mediterranean, Portugal, Andorra, San Marino, Vatican City, Kosovo, Serbia, Bulgaria, North Macedonia and Jordan are often included on the list of Mediterranean countries. Such classification is mostly based on their geographical, economic, geopolitical, historical, ethnic and cultural (language, art, music, cuisine) ties to the region as a whole. Other factors include climate and flora.

List of countries on the Mediterranean Sea
Below is the list of the countries and territories bordering the Mediterranean, listed clockwise from Gibraltar on the southern tip of the Iberian Peninsula:

Southern European coast, from west to east
 (a British Overseas Territory)

 
 

 

Western Asian coast, from north to south

Northern African coast, from east to west

List of countries in the Mediterranean Basin
Below is the list of the countries and territories in the biogeographical Mediterranean Basin.

Southern Europe

 
 (a British Overseas Territory)
 

 

 

 

 
 

Western Asia

Northern Africa

Other countries

 List of countries in the Mediterranean Basin by ecoregion
 List of countries in the drainage basin of the Mediterranean Sea

See also
 List of coastal settlements of the Mediterranean Sea
 Eastern Mediterranean

References

.
Mediterranean
.